Maciste all'inferno (Italian for "Maciste in Hell") may refer to:

 Maciste all'inferno (1925 film), an Italian film directed by Guido Brignone
 Maciste all'inferno (1962 film), a peplum-fantasy film directed by Riccardo Freda
 Maciste All'Inferno (album), an album by Gojira